is a Japanese manga artist. She began submitting manga to comic magazines when she was only 12 years old, in the sixth grade of elementary school. She continued to send her manga to the same magazine for four years, but failed to receive a positive critical reception. Ragawa then decided to switch to a different magazine, Hana to Yume. Her first submission to this magazine won a prize called the "Top Prize". Two years later in 1990, she succeeded in achieving her debut with her one-shot manga , published in Hana to Yume issue  22.

In 1995, she won the 40th Shogakukan Manga Award in the  category for Baby & Me. In 2012, she won both the 36th Kodansha Manga Award in the  category and an Excellence Award at the 16th Japan Media Arts Festival for Those Snow White Notes.

Works

 Time Limit (one-shot, 1990)
 Baby & Me (1991–1997)
  (1993–2014)
 New York New York (1995–1998)
  (1998–2009)
 Those Snow White Notes (2009–2022)
 The Vampire & His Pleasant Companions (with Narise Konohara, 2016–present)

References

External links

  
 Marimo Ragawa at  
 

Female comics writers
Japanese female comics artists
Japanese women writers
Living people
Manga artists from Aomori Prefecture
People from Hachinohe
Women manga artists
Year of birth missing (living people)